Blakstad may refer to:

Places
Blakstad, Agder, the municipal center of Froland municipality, Agder county, Norway
Blakstad Station, a railway station in Froland municipality, Agder county, Norway
Blakstad, Akershus, a village in Asker municipality, Viken county, Norway

People
Bjørn Blakstad (1926-2012), a Norwegian diplomat
Eli Blakstad (born 1962), a Norwegian politician for the Centre Party
Even Blakstad (born 1968), a retired Norwegian football defender
Finn Blakstad (1865-1941), a Norwegian farmer and politician for the Conservative Party
Gudolf Blakstad (1893-1985), a Norwegian architect
Michael Blakstad (born 1940), a television producer and a former Editor of Tomorrow's World on the BBC
Ragnvald Blakstad (1866-1929), a Norwegian industrialist and hydropower pioneer
Wilhelm Blakstad (1863-1936), a Norwegian politician for the Conservative Party